Z29 may refer to:

German destroyer Z29
New South Wales Z29 class locomotive
Finley Air Force Station (NORAD id: Z-29; later Z-303), Finley, North Dakota, USA
Gettysburg Air Force Station (NORAD id: Z-29), Gettysburg, South Dakota, USA
Zenith Data Systems Z-29 computer terminal

See also

 29 (disambiguation)
 Z (disambiguation)